Lieutenant General John L. Dolan (born 1964) is a retired United States Air Force officer who last served as the director for operations (J-3) on the Joint Chiefs of Staff from August 2016 to October 2018. Before that, he served as the commander of United States Forces Japan and commander of 5th Air Force from June 2015 to August 2016.

Dolan received his commission in 1986 through the University of Northern Colorado’s ROTC program. He has held various squadron, wing, headquarters, and combatant command level positions in multiple overseas and deployed assignments. His staff duties included serving on Capitol Hill and directly for the Chairman of the Joint Chiefs of Staff and the Secretary of the Air Force. His commands include the U.S. Air Force F-16 Weapons School, 8th Fighter Wing, 451st Air Expeditionary Wing, Kandahar Air Base (NATO), 5th Air Force and United States Forces Japan.

Dolan is a command pilot with more than 4,000 flying hours, including more than 200 combat missions during Operations Iraqi Freedom, Enduring Freedom, and Northern Watch.

Education
1986 Bachelors of Science, Chemistry, University of Northern Colorado, Greeley  
1993 Squadron Officer School, Maxwell AFB, Alabama
1996 Masters of Aeronautical Science and Technology, Embry Riddle University, Florida
2001 Air Command and Staff College, Maxwell AFB, Alabama
2006 National War College, Fort Lesley J. McNair, Washington, D.C. 
2014 Joint Force Air Component Commander Course, Maxwell AFB, Alabama
2016 Leadership at the Peak, Center for Creative Leadership, Colorado Springs, Colorado

Military assignments
 October 1986 – August 1987, student, Undergraduate Pilot Training, Reese AFB, Texas
 September 1987 – September 1988, student, F-16 Replacement Training Unit, MacDill AFB, Florida
 October 1988 – December 1992, F-16 Instructor Pilot, Flight Examiner, Assistant Chief of Standards and Evaluation, Misawa AB, Japan
 January 1993 – June 1993, student, U.S. Air Force Weapons Instructor Course, Nellis AFB, Nevada
 July 1993 – June 1996, F-16 Weapons Officer and Flight Commander, Spangdahlem AB, Germany
 July 1996 – June 1999, F-16 U.S. Air Force Weapons School Instructor, Flight Commander, Chief of Wing Scheduling, Assistant Operations Officer, Nellis AFB, Nevada
 July 1999 – June 2000, chief of safety, inspector general, 8th Fighter Wing, Kunsan AB, South Korea
 July 2000 – June 2001, student, Air Command and Staff College, Maxwell AFB, Alabama
 July 2001 – June 2002, chief of F-22 Avionics and System Effectiveness, Headquarters Air Combat Command, Langley AFB, Virginia
 July 2002 – June 2005, special assistant to the commandant of U.S. Air Force Weapons School, Commander, 16th Weapons Squadron, Nellis AFB, Nevada
 August 2005 – June 2006, student, National War College, Fort Lesley J. McNair, Washington, D.C.
 July 2006 – March 2007, lead, fixed wing applications, Force Applications, J-8, the Pentagon, Arlington, Virginia
 March 2007 – July 2008, chief of Force Applications Engagement Division, J-8, the Pentagon, Arlington, Virginia
 July 2008 – July 2009, vice commander, 332nd Air Expeditionary Wing, Joint Base Balad, Iraq
 July 2009 – May 2010, chief of Senate legislative liaison, Office of the Secretary of the Air Force, the Pentagon, Arlington, Virginia
 May 2010 – May 2011, commander of 8th Fighter Wing, Kunsan AB, South Korea
 May 2011 – October 2012, deputy director, legislative liaison, Office of the Secretary of the Air Force, the Pentagon, Arlington, Virginia
 November 2012 – November 2013, commander, 451st Air Expeditionary Wing and Kandahar Airfield (NATO), Kandahar, Afghanistan
 January 2014 – May 2014, assistant deputy commander of U.S. Air Forces Central Command and Assistant Vice Commander, 9th Air Expeditionary Task Force, Shaw AFB, South Carolina
 May 2014 – May 2015, chief of staff, United States Pacific Command, Camp H.M. Smith, Hawaii
 June 2015 – August 2016, commander of U.S. Forces Japan and commander of 5th Air Force, Yokota AB, Japan
 August 2016 – October 2018, director for operations (J-3), Joint Staff, the Pentagon, Arlington, Virginia

Effective dates of promotion

References 

Living people
Recipients of the Legion of Merit
United States Air Force generals
University of Northern Colorado alumni
1964 births